The Vector Map (VMAP), also called Vector Smart Map, is a vector-based collection of geographic information system (GIS) data about Earth at various levels of detail. Level 0 (low resolution) coverage is global and entirely in the public domain. Level 1 (global coverage at medium resolution) is only partly in the public domain.

There are ongoing discussions about making most of the information available in the public domain.

Description
Coordinate reference system: Geographic coordinates stored in decimal degrees with southern and western hemispheres using negative values for latitude and longitude, respectively.
Horizontal Datum: World Geodetic System 1984 (WGS 84).
Vertical Datum: Mean Sea Level.

Thematic data layers
Features and data attributes are tagged utilizing the international Feature and Attribute Coding Catalogue (FACC).
major road networks
railroad networks
hydrologic drainage systems
utility networks (cross-country pipelines and communication lines)
major airports
elevation contours
coastlines
international boundaries
populated places
index of geographical names

Levels of resolution
The vector map product are usually seen as being of three different types: low resolution (level 0), medium resolution (level 1) and high resolution (level 2).

Level Zero (VMAP0)
Level 0 provides worldwide coverage of geo-spatial data and is equivalent to a small scale (1:1,000,000). The data are offered either on CD-ROM or as direct download, as they have been moved to the public domain. Data are structured following the Vector Product Format (VPF), compliant with standards MIL-V-89039 and MIL-STD 2407.

Data sets
The entire coverage has been divided into four data sets:
North America (NOAMER) v0noa
Europe and North Asia (EURNASIA) v0eur
South America, Africa, and Antarctica (SOAMAFR) v0soa
South Asia and Australia (SASAUS) v0sas

Level One (VMAP1)
Level 1 data are equivalent to a medium scale resolution (1:250,000). Level 1 tiles follow the MIL-V-89033 standard.
 Horizontal accuracy: 125–500m
 Vertical accuracy: 0.5–2 Contour Interval (for example: if contour interval 50 m, accuracy will be 25 to 100m)

Data sets
VMAP Level 1 is divided in 234 geographical tiles. Only 57 of them are currently (2006) available for download from NGA.
Among the available datasets, coverage can be found for parts of Costa Rica, Libya, United States, Mexico, Iraq, Russia, Panama, Colombia and Japan.

Level Two (VMAP2)
Level 2 data are equivalent to a large scale resolution. Level 2 tiles follow the MIL-V-89032 standard.
 Horizontal accuracy: 50–200m
 Vertical accuracy: 0.5–2 Contour Interval (for example: if contour interval 50 m, accuracy will be 25–100m)

Debate about availability of data
The USA Freedom of Information Act and the Electronic Freedom of Information Act guarantee access to virtually all GIS data created by the US government. Following the trend of the United States, much of the VMAP data has been offered to the public domain.

But many countries consider mapping and cartography a state monopoly; for such countries, the VMAP Level1 data are kept out of the public domain. However, some data may be commercialised by national mapping agencies, sometimes as a consequence of privatisation.

Various public groups are making efforts to have all VMAP1 data moved to the public domain in accordance with FOIA.

Further steps have been taken by the Free World Maps Foundation and others to have the data licensed under the GNU General Public License, while remaining copyrighted, as an alternative to the public domain. This is an ongoing debate (as of 2006).

Copyrights

VMAP0
The U.S. government has released the data into public domain, with the following conditions imposed (quotation from VMAP0 Copyright Statement):

The VMAP0 download page states:

However, all is not quite what it seems. There is a 'readme1.txt' file located in the v0eur, v0sas, and v0soa directories. This file contains information saying that layers: Boundaries Coverage and the Reference Library, are copyrighted to the Environmental Systems Research Institute.

If these copyrighted layers are not used there is no violation of any copyrights.

Tools to read and convert VMAP data
VPFView (V2.1) - developed by NIMA, is available from NGA or USGS (as part of the NIMAMUSE package); this tool can render simple plots and export GIS data to other GIS file formats
 "OGR with OGDI driver": this free software tool can convert VMAP format to standard GIS file formats such as SHAPE, PostGIS etc.

History

1991-1993: The National Imagery and Mapping Agency (NIMA) develops the Digital Chart of the World (DCW) for the US Defense Mapping Agency (DMA) with themes including Political/Ocean Populated Places, Railroads, Roads, Utilities, Drainage, Hypsography, Land Cover, Ocean Features, Physiography, Aeronautical, Cultural Landmarks, Transportation Structure and Vegetation. One of the sources for the data was the Operational Navigation Chart that compiles military mapping from Australia, Canada, United Kingdom, and the United States.
VMAP (level 0) is a slightly more detailed reiteration of the DCW.
VMAP (level 1) has much higher resolution data.
2004 The National Imagery and Mapping Agency (NIMA) is renamed to National Geospatial-Intelligence Agency which will include other mapping agencies such as the Defense Mapping Agency (DMA), the Central Imagery Office (CIO) and the Defense Dissemination Program Office (DDPO). All VMAP data will subsequently be distributed through the NGA.

See also
Natural Earth, free, high-quality global map data
Digital Chart of the World
GSHHS, a high-resolution shoreline data set
GADM, a high-resolution database of country administrative areas
Digital Elevation Model, Digital Terrain Model
GIS
DIGEST VRF and VPF are related and compatible with a few exceptions
Vector tiles

References

 Processing of VMAP0 data with free GIS software: SRTM and VMAP0 data in OGR and GRASS. GRASS Newsletter, 3:2-6, 2005 (M. Neteler)

External links
Vector Map description- at National Geospatial Intelligence Agency
free java viewer
fast java viewer from Idevio
SVG Maps converted from VMAP
VMAP0 data in ESRI shapefile format, ready to download
VMAP1 data in ESRI shapefile format, ready to download
VMAP0 layer documentation

Geographic information systems